Chha kh'nhei (Khmer:ឆាខ្ញី) is a Cambodian stir fry dish. It is commonly made from a meat (usually chicken, eel, or frog) prepared with ginger and an assortment of other spices for flavor.

Description 
Chha kh'nhei is a stir fry made from ginger and a meat, normally chicken, eel, or frog. Other spices, such as peppers, garlic, and chives, and sauces are used to add flavor.

References 

Cambodian cuisine